Duncan McMillan (1914 – 1 June 1993) was a British linguist and philologist. He was John Orr Professor of French Language and Romance Linguistics at the University of Edinburgh and a founder of Société Internationale Rencesvals. McMillan was a winner of Rothschild Prize.

References

1914 births
1993 deaths
Linguists from England
Academics of the University of Edinburgh
British philologists
20th-century philologists